Boris Franzevich Gulko (born February 9, 1947) is a Soviet-American Grandmaster in chess. Gulko is noted to be the only person to win both the Soviet Chess Championship and the U.S. Chess Championship, and for having a positive score against Garry Kasparov.

Life and career

Boris Gulko was born in 1947 to a Jewish family. His father was a soldier of the Red Army and was stationed in East Germany. His family returned to the Soviet Union after a few years. Gulko became an International Master in 1975, and a Grandmaster in 1976.  He won the USSR Chess Championship at Leningrad in 1977 along with Iosif Dorfman.  The Soviets usually would break ties for the title of Soviet Champion with a multi-game match, and 1977 was no exception. However, Gulko and Dorfman were even after the six game playoff, so they shared the title and prestige of Soviet Champion.  They finished half a point ahead of a field that included three former World Champions. Shortly after, Gulko applied to leave the country, but permission was refused. He and his wife, Anna Akhsharumova, who is a Woman Grandmaster of chess, became prominent Soviet Refuseniks. As a vehement anti-Communist, he was once arrested and beaten by KGB agents.

They weren't allowed in top-level chess competition until the period of glasnost arrived, and Gulko was finally allowed to emigrate to the United States in 1986. "Thirty-nine is too old to start playing and training to reach the highest achievement in chess," said Gulko, "those seven years were a serious blow for my chess career, but I don't regret them."

After moving to the U.S. he won the U.S. Chess Championship in 1994 and 1999.  He is the only chess player ever to have held both the American and Soviet championship titles. Gulko also holds an amazing positive score against Garry Kasparov, with three victories, four draws, and only one defeat, in games played from 1978 to 2001 (according to ChessGames.com).

Gulko was subject to anti-semitic discrimination 20 years later. He qualified to play at the 2004 World Chess Championship in Libya. The president of the Libyan Organizing Committee, dictator Gaddafi’s son, announced:  "We did not and will not invite the Zionist enemies to this championship." Gulko and several other Jewish players withdrew from the tournament, and Gulko said in a letter to Kirsan Ilyumzhinov, the president of FIDE: "I implore you not to be the first president of FIDE to preside over the first world chess championship from which Jews are excluded.  Our magnificent and noble game does not deserve such a disgrace."

Gulko played for Soviet Union in the Chess Olympiad of 1978 and for the United States in the Chess Olympiads of 1988–2004. He is still playing chess, although he does not participate in a large number of tournaments. After living in Fair Lawn, New Jersey for many years, the Gulkos moved to Jerusalem  in 2019.

Notable games

Gulko has a plus record against Garry Kasparov (+3−1=4).  He even beat Kasparov with the black pieces in Russia in 1982:

Kasparov vs. Gulko, Russia 1982 
1.d4 d5 2.c4 dxc4 3.e3 Nf6 4.Bxc4 e6 5.Nf3 c5 6.0-0 a6 7.e4 b5 8.Bd3 Bb7 9.Bg5 cxd4 10.Nxd4 Nbd7 11.Nc3 Ne5 12.Ncxb5 Nxd3 13.Qxd3 axb5 14.Rfd1 Be7 15.Qxb5+ Qd7 16.Qb3 Bxe4 17.Nf5 Bd5 18.Nxg7+ Kf8 19.Qh3 h5 20.Qg3 Kxg7 21.Bxf6+ Kxf6 22.Rd4 Bd6 23.Qc3 Kg6 24.h3 Bc7 0–1

References

Books

External links
 

"An Open Letter to the President of FIDE, Mr. Kirsan Ilyumzhinov, from Grandmaster Boris Gulko,"  from gmsquare.com
Interview With GM Boris Gulko 

1947 births
Living people
Russian Jews
American chess players
Chess grandmasters
Chess Olympiad competitors
Jewish chess players
People from Fair Lawn, New Jersey
Soviet chess players
Sportspeople from Erfurt
Refuseniks
Russian anti-communists
Jewish anti-communists
Soviet emigrants to the United States